Amanita roseotincta is a species of agaric fungus in the family Amanitaceae found in North America. It was first described by American mycologist William Alphonso Murrill in 1914 as a species of Venenarius before being transferred to Amanita the same year.

See also

List of Amanita species

References

roseotincta
Fungi of the United States
Fungi described in 1914
Taxa named by William Alphonso Murrill
Fungi without expected TNC conservation status